Liebeck is a German-language surname. Notable people with the name include:

Jack Liebeck (born 1980), British violinist
Martin Liebeck (born 1954), Professor of Pure Mathematics at Imperial College London
Robert H. Liebeck, American aerospace engineer
Pamela Liebeck (1930–2020), British mathematician and mathematics educator
Stella Liebeck, plaintiff in the case of Liebeck v. McDonald's Restaurants, about the temperature of McDonald's coffee

German-language surnames